Avalanche Peak is a  summit located on the shared border of Yellowstone National Park and North Absaroka Wilderness, in Park County, Wyoming. It is part of the Absaroka Range. It features a large bowl covered in scree and is popular with hikers for its view of Yellowstone Lake and the surrounding area. The mountain's name was officially adopted in 1930 by the United States Board on Geographic Names.

Climate 
According to the Köppen climate classification system, Avalanche Peak is located in a subarctic climate zone with long, cold, snowy winters, and mild summers. Winter temperatures can drop below −10 °F with wind chill factors below −30 °F.

Gallery

See also
 List of mountains and mountain ranges of Yellowstone National Park

References

External links

 Weather forecast: Avalanche Peak
 Avalanche Peak Trail: National Park Service

Mountains of Park County, Wyoming
Mountains of Wyoming
North American 3000 m summits
Mountains of Yellowstone National Park